Když struny lkají is a 1930 Czechoslovak drama film  directed by Friedrich Fehér. It is considered the first Czechoslovak film fully made with synchronized sound.

Cast
Václav Vydra as  Farmer Michovský
Magda Sonja as Slávka, Michovský's wife 
Hans Feher as Jeníček, Michovský's son 
Jaroslav Kocian as Marek 
Olga Augustová as Lady in a bar
Hugo Haas as Gentleman in a bar
Marie Tauberová as Bar visitor
Milka Balek-Brodská as Nováková 
Josef Loskot as Michovský's guest
Čeněk Šlégl as Toman
Josef Rovenský as Skála
Otto Rubík as Officer Prokop
Rudolf Nížkovský as Bartender
Josef Šváb-Malostranský as Bar patron
Filip Balek-Brodský as Bar patron

References

External links 
 

1930 films
1930s Czech-language films
Czechoslovak black-and-white films
Czech comedy-drama films
1930s adventure comedy-drama films
Czechoslovak multilingual films
Czechoslovak comedy-drama films
1930 multilingual films
1930s Czech films
Czech black-and-white films